Balwant Singh Ramoowalia (born 15 March 1942) is an Indian politician from Samajwadi Party. His father  Karnail Singh Paras was a well-known Kavishar.
Balwant Singh started his political career with student politics as a general secretary of Student Federation of India in 1963. He went on to join All India Sikh Students' Federation and was its president from 1968 to 1972. Later he joined Akali Dal and became Member of Parliament twice from Faridkot and Sangrur. He left Akali Dal to get elected to Rajya Sabha in 1996 and served as the Union Minister for Social Welfare.

Position held
Ramoowalia was 
President of All India Sikh Students Federation, 1968–72 
General Secretary, Students' Federation of India, 1963–64

Leader of Akali Dal in 8th Lok Sabha
Member, (i) Senate Punjabi University, Patiala, 1978–80, (ii) Syndicate, Punjabi University, Patiala since 1996, (iii) Board of Indian Airlines, 1991–93, (iv) 6th and 8th Lok Sabha, (v) Public Accounts Committee, 1987–88, (vi) Estimates Committee, 1986–87, (vii) Committee on Public Undertakings, 1988–89, (viii) Business Advisory Committee, 1978–79, (ix) Committee on Petitions, 1978–79, (x) Consultative Committee for the Ministry of Industry, 1985–89, (xi) Consultative Committee for the Ministry of External Affairs, 1978–79 and (xii) Committee on Labour and Welfare

Union Minister of Social Welfare, 1996–98
elected to the Rajya Sabha in November, 1996.
Prison minister in Government of Uttar Pradesh 2015-2017 (Akhilesh Yadav ministry)

Other associations
Chief Patron, International Punjabi Society
President, Shiromani Punjabi Sabha
Member, India International Centre.
Travels abroad: UK, U.S., Russia, Canada, Netherlands, Australia, Italy, Iraq, Pakistan, Nepal, Sri Lanka, Hong Kong, Japan and Philippines.
Awarded "Secular Punjabi of the Globe" by the Indo-Canadian Association, Vancouver, British Columbia, Canada.
Publications: Punjab Di Dhaun Utte Talwar.

References

External links
 B.S Ramoowalia Speaks On YPDTV
 Heroes of 2007: Stopping Scams

Punjabi people
Living people
Shiromani Akali Dal politicians
Communist Party of India (Marxist) politicians from Punjab, India
Samajwadi Party politicians
India MPs 1977–1979
India MPs 1984–1989
1942 births
Rajya Sabha members from Uttar Pradesh
Lok Sabha members from Punjab, India
People from Faridkot district
Members of the Uttar Pradesh Legislative Council
People from Sangrur district